The British Sports Journalism Awards are given annually in a number of categories. The category "Specialist Correspondent of the Year" is awarded for sports writing. From 2016, it excluded football, cricket and rugby union correspondents, who had their own separate categories. Records date back to 2005.

Specialist Correspondent of the Year winners 

 2018: tbc
 2017: Sean Ingle – The Guardian and Observer
 2016: Sean Ingle – The Guardian and Observer
 2015: Alastair Down – Racing Post
 2014: Paul Mahoney – Freelance
 2013: Henry Winter – The Telegraph
 2012: Michael Atherton – The Times
 2011: Michael Atherton – The Times
 2010: Henry Winter – The Telegraph
 2009: Henry Winter – The Telegraph
 2008: Michael Atherton – The Times
 2007: Kevin Garside – The Telegraph
 2006: Doug Gillon – The Herald
 2005: Matt Dickinson – The Times

References 

British journalism awards